is a Jōdo shū Buddhist temple in Kamakura, Kanagawa, Japan. Famous for its rhododendrons, it was named after its founder's (great historical figure Hōjō Masako) posthumous name. The main object of worship is Amida Nyorai, but it also enshrines Senju Kannon, Goddess of Mercy. An’yō-in is Number three of the 33 temples of the Bandō Sanjūsankasho pilgrimage circuit.

History 
This temple has a complex history and is the result of the fusion of three separate temples called Chōraku-ji, Zendō-ji and Tashiro-ji. It was first opened in 1225 as Chōraku-ji in Hase Sasamegayatsu by Hōjō Masako for her defunct husband Minamoto no Yoritomo, founder of the Kamakura shogunate. At the time it was a Ritsu sect temple. After being burned to the ground by Nitta Yoshisada's soldiery in 1333 at the fall of the Kamakura shogunate, it was fused with Zendō-ji, moved to this spot and renamed, but it burned again in 1680. It was then once more rebuilt and a Senju Kannon (Thousand-armed Goddess of Mercy) was transferred to it from Tashiro-ji in Hikigayatsu.

Points of interest 
The great Chinese black pine in the garden is over 700 years old. Behind the temple there are two hōkyōintō. The smallest is one of Masako's possible graves. The other is the oldest hōkyōintō in Kamakura and a nationally designated Important Cultural Property. In the temple's small cemetery down the alley in front of the temple's gate rests famous film director Akira Kurosawa.

See also 
 For an explanation of terms concerning Japanese Buddhism, Japanese Buddhist art, and Japanese Buddhist temple architecture, see the Glossary of Japanese Buddhism.

Notes

References

 Anyoin 
 Article "An'yō-in", Japanese Wikipedia, accessed in April 2008 
 Ozu Yasujiro 

Buddhist temples in Kamakura, Kanagawa
Pure Land temples